Josep Moragues i Mas (Sant Hilari Sacalm, 1669 - Barcelona, 1715) was a Catalan general during the War of the Spanish Succession. He fought on the Archduke Charles' side.

After Barcelona was defeated on 11 September 1714, he tried to sail to Majorca in order to continue the resistance against Philippist invasion, but he was betrayed and imprisoned. He was tortured and finally executed on 27 March 1715. His corpse was butchered, the head placed inside a cage which was hanged in the streets for 12 years. This was intended as a warning for those who might rebel against the new King's power.

Later political significance
Catalanists regard him as a national hero, a martyr for Catalonia. As with Rafael Casanova, there are several homages and floral offerings around monuments dedicated to him during commemorations of 11 September, which was instituted by Catalanists in the 19th century as the National Day of Catalonia in remembrance of the battle fought and lost by Moragues amongst others.

See also
Principality of Catalonia
Generalitat de Catalunya
Consell de Cent
La Coronela
War of the Spanish Succession
National Day of Catalonia
General Moragues
Rafael Casanova

External links
 General Moragues
Personal website of Jordi Torrades. It talks about the War of the Spanish Succession
 La Coronela of the town of Barcelona
 The Battle of the 11 of September 1714
 https://web.archive.org/web/20091027034128/http://es.geocities.com/mitologics/Llegendes/moragues.html (In Catalan)
 General Moragues, el diable de les Guilleries by Alex Barnils (In Catalan), launched on 26 March 2014, at the Born Centre Cultural (Comercial, 5. 08003 Barcelona).

Military history of Catalonia
People from Catalonia
People from Selva
Spanish generals
18th-century Spanish people
Spanish army commanders in the War of the Spanish Succession
Executed Spanish people
1669 births
1715 deaths
Soldiers from Catalonia
18th-century executions by Spain